A kaleidoscope is a tube of mirrors containing small colored objects.

Kaleidoscope may also refer to:

Computing 
 Kaleidoscope (programming language), a constraint programming language
 Kaleidoscope (software), a shareware application similar to the Mac OS Appearance Manager
 Kaleidoscope, a hardware extension for the SAM Coupé home computer

Film, television, and radio  
 Kaleidoscope (1966 film), British crime film starring Warren Beatty
 Kaleidoscope (1990 film), American television film based on the Danielle Steel novel (see below)
 Kaleidoscope (2016 film), psychological thriller film starring Toby Jones
 Kaleidoscope (British TV series), light entertainment show
 Kaleidoscope (American TV series), a 2023 Netflix heist drama series
 "Kaleidoscope" (Ozark), a 2017 television episode
 Kaleidoscope (US radio series), American discussion program, later renamed The Diane Rehm Show
 Kaleidoscope (UK radio series), British arts programme
 Kaleidoscope Entertainment, Indian film and television production company
 Kaleidoscope, an alternate title for Frenzy, an unproduced Alfred Hitchcock film
 "Kaleidoscope", a 1951 episode of the radio program Dimension X, based on the Ray Bradbury short story (see below)
Kaleidoscope (organisation), television heritage organisation

Literature 
 Kaleidoscope (novel), a 1987 novel by Danielle Steel
 Kaleidoscope (short story collection), a 1990 book by Harry Turtledove
 "Kaleidoscope", a short story by Ray Bradbury in his book The Illustrated Man

Music

Performers 
 Kaleidoscope (American band), a 1960s psychedelic folk band
 Kaleidoscope (British band), a 1960s psychedelic band
 Kaleidoscope (music duo), an American Christian pop group

Albums 
 Kaleidoscope (Cyrus Chestnut album), 2018
 Kaleidoscope (Kelis album), 1999
 Kaleidoscope (Nancy Wilson album), 1971
 Kaleidoscope (Rachael Lampa album), 2002
 Kaleidoscope (Siouxsie and the Banshees album), 1980
 Kaleidoscope (Sonny Stitt album), 1957
 Kaleidoscope (Tiësto album) or the title song, 2009
 Kaleidoscope (Transatlantic album) or the title song, 2014
 Kaleidoscopes, a series of albums by Hennie Bekker
 Kaleidoscope, by Ben Granfelt Band, 2009
 Kaleidoscope, by DJ Food, 2000
 Kaleidoscope, by Jam & Spoon, 1997
 Kaleidoscope, by Mekong Delta, 1992
 Kaleidoscope, by Mother Superior, 1997
 Kaleidoscope, by Roland Grapow, 1999

EPs 
 Kaleidoscope EP, by Coldplay, 2017
 Kaleidoscope (Courtney Act EP) or the title song
 Kaleidoscope, by the Boo Radleys, 1990
 Kaleidoscope, by Brooke Duff, 2013

Songs 
 "Kaleidoscope" (Kaya song), 2006
 "Kaleidoscope", by BadBadNotGood from III, 2014
 "Kaleidoscope", by Blink-182 from Neighborhoods, 2011
 "Kaleidoscope", by Coldplay from A Head Full of Dreams, 2015
 "Kaleidoscope", by D'espairsRay from Mirror, 2007
 "Kaleidoscope", by David Geraghty from Kill Your Darlings, 2007
 "Kaleidoscope", by James from The Morning After, 2010
 "Kaleidoscope", by Joe Brooks from Constellation Me, 2010
 "Kaleidoscope", by Kate Havnevik from Melankton, 2006
 "Kaleidoscope", by Knife Party from Abandon Ship, 2014
 “Kaleidoscope”, by Machine Head from Catharsis, 2018
 "Kaleidoscope", by Meshuggah from Immutable, 2022
 "Kaleidoscope", by the Ornette Coleman Quartet from This Is Our Music, 1961
 "Kaleidoscope", by Paul van Dyk from Reflections, 2003
 "Kaleidoscope", by Procol Harum from Procol Harum, 1967
 "Kaleidoscope", by Ride from Nowhere, 1990
 "Kaleidoscope", by Ringo Deathstarr from Colour Trip, 2011
 "Kaleidoscope", by Saves the Day from Under the Boards, 2007
 "Kaleidoscope", by the Script from #3, 2012
 "Kaleidoscope", by Simple Minds from Celebration, 1982
 "Kaleidoscope", by the Suicide Machines from A Match and Some Gasoline, 2003
 "Kaleidoscope", by Tiamat from Wildhoney, 1994

Publications 
 Kaleidoscope (journal), a peer-reviewed publication of Semmelweis University.
 Kaleidoscope (newspaper), a defunct underground newspaper published in Milwaukee, Wisconsin
 The Kaleidoscope, a 19th-century Liverpool weekly magazine
 Kaleidoscope Publishing, a UK publishing house
 Kaleidoscope Magazine, a student publication of Poudre High School, Fort Collins, Colorado, U.S.

Other uses 
 Kaleidoscope (Expo 67), a pavilion at Expo 67 in Montreal, Canada
 Kaleidoscope (retailer), a British mail order company
 Kaleidoscope Festival, Sophia College, an annual arts festival in Mumbai, India
 Kaleidoscope at the Hub, a shopping mall in Des Moines, Iowa, U.S.
 The Kaleidoscope Trust, an organisation that campaigns for human rights of LGBT people worldwide
 Kaleidoscope, a collective name for a group of butterflies; see List of animal names

See also 
 
 Kaleidoscópio, a Brazilian drum and bass duo